Petar Dyaksov is a Bulgarian entrepreneur and a digital marketing specialist. He is a founder and manager of the digital marketing agency Tendrik. Also, he is the founder and co-founder of different online businesses like fragrances.bg, timedix.com and semando.com.

Education
Born in Plovdiv, Petar Dyaksov graduated his BA in "Business Management" at the University of Essex and later on acquired a Master's Degree in "International Business" at Aston University in England.

In 2013, he returned to Plovdiv and joined the international non-governmental youth organization for Bulgaria – JCI (Junior Chamber International). The organization's aim is to unify young people between the ages of 18 and 40, all voluntarily! Also, the JCI organization helps organizing social activities, social initiatives, and events in Plovdiv.

In the period of 2014–2015 he was the president of the local section JCI Plovdiv and in 2017 he became president of the national organization JCI Bulgaria. He participated in the realization and organization of various projects, among them are "Ten Outstanding Young Persons" in Bulgaria TOYP, "First Steps in Business", "Book Box" and others.

Business projects

fragrances.bg
In 2011 he launches the online store for branded perfumes – fragrances.bg by the brand of Venera Cosmetics. In 2016 the management was taken over by Venera Commerce Ltd., whose’ manager is Petar Dyaksov.

Tendrik

In 2015 Dyaksov founded the digital and web agency Tendrik (Tendrik Ltd). Tendrik is an IT company offering the development of websites, online shops, design, branding, and digital marketing strategies for different types of businesses. In 2019 the company merged with the digital agency SEOMAX.

Tendrik (Tendrik Ltd.) is an IT company that offers different kinds of services related to online business. Its main activities: 

 Creating an online store; 
 Creating a corporate website; 
 Extensions for an online store; 
 Web design; 
 Digital marketing strategy; 
 SEO optimization; 
 Facebook advertising; 
 Google Ads; 
 Copywriting; 
 Social Network Marketing; 
 Video marketing.

There are a number of clients in the company portfolio, both small and larger. Companies from different spheres and with a different range of activities.

Semando Ltd.
In 2018 he becomes co-founder of the online store for branded watches timedix.bg (Semando Ltd.)

Trainings and seminars
Over the years Dyaksov was conducting different seminars and lectures. Some of the lectures, which he was leading were "How to create an amazing online store", "10 steps of creating a successful online store", "E-commerce training", "How to be more effective and successful", "and "SEO education for non-professionals", "My first steps in business" and others.

Books
Dyaksov is the co-author of the book for the world of branded perfumery – "The perfumes from A to Z" which was published in 2016 together with Hristina Dimitrova – a freelance writer in the sphere of international commerce, online marketing and copywriting. In the edition can be found many details concerning the perfumery world, the history of the perfumes and technics of perfume production.

References

External links
Official website

1989 births
Living people
Bulgarian businesspeople
Bulgarian company founders
Alumni of the University of Essex
Alumni of Aston University
People from Plovdiv